Chithiram Pesuthadi is a 2006 Indian Tamil-language romantic action drama film written and directed by Mysskin in his directorial debut. The film stars Narain and Bhavana, both making their debuts in Tamil cinema,.  The film's score and soundtrack are composed by Sundar C Babu with cinematography by Mahesh Muthuswami and editing by M. Kasi Viswanathan. Produced by Dreambridge Productions on a budget of  1.20 crores, the film faced publicity issues but later released in Chennai and the rest of Tamil Nadu. The movie  became a massive hit of that year. 

The film was later remade to Telugu as Raju Bhai, in Kannada as Kichha Huchha and in Oriya as Abhimanyu.

Plot

Thirunavukarasu, aka Thiru (Narain), a fearless karate fighter, saves the son of a local don from being killed by members of a rival gang. In return, the don Annachi (Dhandapani) hires Thiru as his henchman. Thiru's mother (Sathyapriya) and younger sister dislike his association with the gang but have to live with his decision.

One day, Thiru stumbles upon Charumathi, aka Charu (Bhavana), a worker at an NGO who fights injustice. A quarrel ensues between them, and they grow to dislike each other. Nobody has spoken up to Thiru before, and he admires Charu's courage. Whenever they bump into one another, Charu berates Thiru for being a gangster. Ashamed, Thiru and a few of the gangsters try to turn over a new leaf by selling toys at a sidewalk.

Charu is impressed by Thiru's changed personality and decides to marry him. Her father (Raviprakash) gives her his blessings, though her uncle (Mahadevan) does not approve. However, her hopes are shattered after she witnessed a naked Thiru being clumped away in a police truck from a brothel after a raid. She gives up her plans of being with him and blames her father for not raising her well enough to make the right decision. Later that day, her father commits suicide. Charu blames Thiru for ruining her life and causing her father's death. Thiru and his friends return to Annachi.

Charu's uncle arranges for her to be married to his own relative. However, Annachi's son sees Charu during her engagement and falls in love with her. Annachi threatens Charu's uncle to surrender his niece to him. After learning that Thiru is part of Annachi's gang, Charu goes to confront him. Thiru's friends reveal that he was only at the brothel that day to save his friend's family, who lives there. Instead, he sees Charu's father there, who was in the company of prostitutes. In order to give time for Charu's father to flee the area, Thiru creates a distraction by attacking the police officers. They beat him up and tear him off his clothes while trying to arrest him. Charu realizes her mistake and asks Thiru's friends to take her to him.

Meanwhile, Thiru has devised his own plans in an attempt to thwart Annachi's plans and save Charu. He has arranged for his friends to bring Charu and her fiancé separately to the registrar's office to get them married. However, Annachi shows up and orders his men to attack Thiru. When Charu arrives at the scene, she is overwhelmed to see that Thiru has been stabbed and is fighting for his life. Only then does Annachi realize that she and Thiru are in love. He stops the attack and lets Thiru's friends rush him to the hospital. Thiru is saved, and Annachi agrees to let him go. He marries Charu, and they live happily ever after.

Cast
 Narain as Thirunavukarasu
 Bhavana as Charumathi
 Dhandapani as Annachi
 Delhi Ganesh as Prakash
 Raviprakash as Charu's father
 Mahadevan as Charu's uncle
 Sathyapriya as Thiru's mother
 Vasantha Narayan
 Gana Ulaganathan
 Malavika in a special appearance

Inspiration
Mysskin expressed at a book release that he himself got to realize that this movie is an accidental inspiration of Beauty and the Beast while the shooting was progressing. He questioned the critics why they failed to criticize about this accidental inspiration, whereas they criticized Nandalala, his other movie to be a copy of Kikujiro. He expressed this was irrelevant to the book release.

Soundtrack
The film's score and soundtrack were composed by Sundar C Babu, who made his debut in film scoring through this film. The album features 12 tracks overall, including four instrumental tracks. The lyrics were penned by Kabilan and director Mysskin himself, while Gana Ulaganathan had written and sung the song "Vazha Meenu", which is considered as having contributed immensely to the film's success.

Release
Released by Dreambride Productions on 10 February 2006, the film initially failed to attract an audience due to a low-profile release and a lack of publicity. It was removed from almost all theaters within two weeks after its release. SUN Networks helped promote the song Vaazha Meenu by repeated airings on its channels, making the song a cult hit. In the meantime, the movie generated a word of mouth publicity combined with excellent press reviews. Taking the cue, Dreambridge initiated the process to re-release in the Chennai area first. The re-release witnessed a tremendous opening which invoked the interest of Aascar Ravichandran, who distributed the film to the rest of Tamil Nadu. The re-release of the film was well received by the audience, which resulted in a stupendous hit.

Accolades

Sequel 
A standalone sequel named Chithiram Pesuthadi 2 was released in 2019 by the same production company.

References

External links
 

2006 films
Tamil films remade in other languages
Films directed by Mysskin
2000s Tamil-language films
Indian action drama films
Films scored by Sundar C. Babu
2006 directorial debut films
2006 action drama films
2006 romantic drama films